Parametriocnemus is a genus of non-biting midges, distributed world-wide (except Antarctica), in the subfamily Orthocladiinae of the  family (Chironomidae).

Chironomidae
Diptera of Europe